Frank T. Campbell (May 8, 1836 – March 6, 1907) was an American politician and businessman.

Born in Ohio, Campbell moved to Newton, Iowa and was in the newspaper and insurance business. He served in the Union Army during the American Civil War. He was a two-term member of the Iowa Senate from 1870 to 1878, first for District 27 and then for District 28, and subsequently served as Lieutenant Governor of Iowa under Governor John H. Gear. Later he was appointed Railroad Commissioner of Iowa. He died in Lima, Ohio.

Notes

1836 births
1907 deaths
People from Newton, Iowa
Politicians from Lima, Ohio
People of Iowa in the American Civil War
Iowa state senators
Lieutenant Governors of Iowa
19th-century American politicians